Revista Fundațiilor Regale ("The Review of Royal Foundations") was a monthly literary, art and culture magazine published in Romania between 1934 and 1947.

References

1934 establishments in Romania
1947 disestablishments in Romania
Defunct literary magazines published in Europe
Defunct magazines published in Romania
Magazines established in 1934
Magazines disestablished in 1947
Romanian-language magazines
Literary magazines published in Romania
Monthly magazines published in Romania